Gondreville is a commune in the Meurthe-et-Moselle department in north-eastern France. It was a base for the United States Air Service during World War I.

See also
Communes of the Meurthe-et-Moselle department

References

External links

USAS in France interactive Google Map of bases, etc. at www.usaww1.com

Communes of Meurthe-et-Moselle